Bronzeville is an original play written by Tim Toyama and Aaron Woolfolk. Developed and produced by the Robey Theatre Company. The original production and two subsequent revivals were directed by Ben Guillory. The play had its world premiere at the Los Angeles Theatre Center in Los Angeles, California, on April 17, 2009, and enjoyed an extended, sold-out run. Woolfolk and Toyama were subsequently nominated for an Ovation Award, and they and Guillory were nominated for NAACP Theatre Awards.

The play is named after the nickname given to the Little Tokyo, Los Angeles, neighborhood from 1942 to 1945 when Japanese Americans were taken from their homes and put into internment camps. During that time, many African Americans migrating to California from the southern United States settled in Little Tokyo, which became known as Bronzeville.

The play is about an African American family from Mississippi that moves to Los Angeles. When they find a Japanese American man hiding in the attic, the family must confront their own values as they struggle to both protect themselves and do what is right. The timeline of the play runs from the spring of 1942 to the spring of 1945.

Bronzeville had its first revival as an abridged version in May 2011 at the Manzanar National Historic Site in Independence, California. It was produced by The Robey Theatre Company in association with Manzanar National Historic Site and Inyo Council for the Arts. A second revival production, this time of the full play, was produced by The Robey Theatre Company in association with the Latino Theater Company and Kathie Foley Meyer and was staged at the Los Angeles Theatre Center in June and July 2013 as part of the Project Bronzeville festival. On March 28, 2014, a staged reading of the play was presented by The Lorraine Hansberry Theatre in San Francisco, California.

Plot 

As Japanese Americans in the Los Angeles neighborhood of Little Tokyo are loaded onto buses that will take them to various internment camps, Hide "Henry" Tahara lets camera shop proprietor Sam Teraoka in on a secret: He plans to hide in his home. Citing the 14th Amendment to the U.S. Constitution, Henry says the rounding up of Japanese Americans is illegal, and he refuses to go along with it. Sam wishes Henry luck.

Several weeks later, the Goodwin Family—Mama Janie, her oldest grandson Jodie, Jodie's wife Alice, their daughter Princess, and Jodie's younger brother Felix—enters their new house, having just arrived in Los Angeles from Mississippi. While the women talk of exploring the neighborhood, Jodie argues with his brother over whether Felix should get a 9 to 5 job or find a jazz club to perform in. Just then a weak and hungry Henry comes down the stairs, surprising the Goodwins. Jodie quickly subdues him.

Under questioning, Henry explains that this is his family's home and that he has been hiding in the attic. He becomes upset when he learns the house was illegally rented out. Jodie expresses concern that the family could suffer dire consequences if they are discovered harboring someone who should be in government custody. He demands Henry come to the police station with him, until Mama Janie reminds the family how, as a child during slavery, she witnessed her uncle's brutal execution after he was caught trying to escape to freedom. Over Jodie's objections the family agrees to protect Henry.

The Goodwins and Henry quickly warm to each other. Moreover, Henry and Princess develop a strong mutual attraction. It also becomes clear that some tensions have accompanied the family from Mississippi. In particular, Jodie is upset that Felix refuses to join the first group of African Americans being trained for the United States Marine Corps in North Carolina. Felix quickly finds work playing saxophone at the Sahara, a newly opened jazz club in the neighborhood. When he learns the owner, Tubby, needs a photographer to help promote the club, he remembers some of Henry's photos that he saw and recommends his "Chinese friend" for the job.

Using an old Time magazine article on how to tell the difference between Japanese and Chinese, Felix coaches Henry to act like the latter so he can work at the Sahara. Princess goes with Henry on a fun excursion to Chinatown to test his new "Chinese" mannerisms. After they return, Alice takes Princess aside and says she and Jodie have noticed the budding romance with Henry, and orders Princess to put an end to it. Overhearing the conversation, Mama Janie invites Princess to help her in the garden, then encourages her great-granddaughter to live her life the way she sees fit.

A few nights later at the Sahara, Felix plays with the band while Henry takes photographs. Princess comes and quickly gains the attention of several men, but she ignores them and flirts with Henry. When they start dancing together, Henry is attacked, causing Felix to leave the stage to defend him. A huge brawl ensues. Back at the house, Jodie and Alice scold Princess and Felix for her being at the club. Jodie also admonishes Henry for causing the fight, especially when Henry is supposed to be in hiding.

Jodie tells Alice he's decided to turn Henry in before the authorities discover the family is hiding him. After getting resistance from Alice, Jodie goes to a bar to consider what to do. The bartender, Hamp, talks about the changing neighborhood, then tells Jodie how everyone is talking about a brawl that started at the Sahara "over an Oriental man being sweet on a colored woman." Fearing his family's secret will be exposed, Jodie goes to the police station and tells them about Henry. Later that night, the police and FBI come to the house and take Henry away.

In federal detention, Henry undergoes days of intense interrogation that nearly breaks him. A kind FBI agent, Larry, offers Henry a way out: enlistment in a new unit of Japanese American soldiers that will fight in the war. Henri reluctantly agrees and joins the 442nd Infantry Regiment. As he sees action in Europe, Henry writes letters to the Goodwins detailing his exploits. Princess writes several letters back, updating Henry about life in the neighborhood. A telegram later arrives from the War Department, addressed to Henry's father: Henry has been killed in action. The news devastates the Goodwins, and Princess accuses Jodie of being responsible for his death.

As Japanese Americans fill the streets after the end of internment, the Goodwins pack in preparation for their move to the Crenshaw area of Los Angeles. Henry's father Naoma, a neighborhood leader who was taken away by federal authorities the night of the Japanese attack on Pearl Harbor, comes to meet the family. He thanks them for sheltering Henry and showing him love and kindness. The family joins Naoma in reciting a Buddhist prayer for Henry's soul.

History of the play 

Tim Toyama had already shown an interest in the interaction between Japanese Americans and African Americans with his play Yuri and Malcolm, about the friendship between Japanese American Civil Rights activist Yuri Kochiyama and Civil Rights icon and Black Nationalist leader Malcolm X. When he learned from a friend about Little Tokyo's Bronzeville period, he felt it provided a wonderful subject for a play.

Coincidentally, at around the same time Aaron Woolfolk helped to paint the Little Tokyo Mural as a volunteer activity with his Japan Exchange and Teaching Programme alumni group, the JET Alumni Association of Southern California. Curious about an image on the mural depicting jazz legend Charlie Parker, Woolfolk was told about the neighborhood's Bronzeville period and how Parker had been one of its residents. Woolfolk wrote down the basic information with plans to someday explore writing a screenplay on the subject.

In 2007 Toyama approached Robey Theatre Company artistic director Ben Guillory and told him he wanted to do a play about Little Tokyo's Bronzeville period in a way that intertwined the Japanese American and African American experiences. Guillory was enthusiastic about the idea, and said he would like to see such a play as a Robey Theatre Company production. Toyama said he felt he needed to create, develop, and write the play with an African American writer, and asked Guillory if he could recommend anyone. Guillory told him he had the ideal person in mind: Woolfolk, who at the time was developing his feature film The Harimaya Bridge—about an African American man in Japan—with Guillory cast in the lead role.

Guillory introduced Toyama and Woolfolk, and they agreed to move forward on the project together. Over the next two years Toyama and Woolfolk came up with the plot and characters, developed the story, and wrote the play under Guillory's tutelage.

Both writers drew heavily on their personal experiences when creating the plot and characters. Toyama was inspired by a friend who had known of an instance in which an African American family had hidden a Japanese American man during internment in the 1940s. He also called on his upbringing and experiences as a member of the Japanese American community, including having several close relatives and friends who were in internment camps. Woolfolk drew on his lifelong friendships with Japanese Americans, his experiences living and working in Japan, family stories of black migration from the Deep South to California in the 1940s, the murder of a Japanese friend in New York City and his subsequent visit to see her parents in Japan, a longtime interest in the Montford Point Marines, and his love of jazz music. Toyama and Woolfolk also did a lot of research, viewing old documents from the era and interviewing experts on Little Tokyo and its Bronzeville period. Some of the Robey Theatre Company's early marketing materials erroneously stated that the play was based on a true story. This resulted from a misunderstanding, as the plot, situations, and characters were entirely created by Woolfolk and Toyama.

In 2008 Toyama entered the play into the East West Players David Henry Hwang Writer's Institute, under which he and Woolfolk further developed the play and where it was performed for the first time in a staged reading.

Bronzeville premiered on April 17, 2009 as a Robey Theatre Company production at the Los Angeles Theatre Center. It enjoyed a sold-out run and was extended by two weeks.

Reception 
Bronzeville received rave reviews, with Toyama and Woolfolk getting praise for the story, characterizations, and dialogue; and Guillory drawing raves for his innovative staging. The cast was also heralded for its performances. Upon its premiere the play made the Los Angeles Times Critics Choice list. The 2013 revival also garnered strong critical notices. The LA Stage Times called it "a revelation" and described it as having "a fine-grained consistency" that "packs a powerful punch."

Awards and recognition 
Woolfolk and Toyama were nominated for an Ovation Award in the category Best Playwrighting for an Original Play.

Bronzeville was also nominated for four NAACP Theater Awards: Toyama and Woolfolk for Best Playwright, Guillory for Best Director, the cast for Best Ensemble Cast, and Luke Moyer for Best Lighting, for which he won.

Characters 
Hide "Henry" Tahara (Original cast member: Jeff Manabat)
Jodie Goodwin (Original cast member: Dwain A. Perry)
Alice Goodwin (Original cast member: Adenrele Ojo)
Mama Janie (Original cast member: CeCe Antoinette)
Felix Goodwin (Original cast member: Larry Powell)
Jane "Princess" Goodwin (Original cast member: Candice Afia)
Joseph Cardell "Tubby" Griffin (Original cast member: Robert Clements)
Theodus "Hamp" Hampton (Original cast member: Landon H. Lewis, Jr.)
June Bug (Original cast member: Anthony B. Phillips)
Naoma Tahara (Original cast member: Dana Lee)
FBI Agent Frank Morgan (Original cast member: Benjamin Fitch)
Officer Smith (Original cast member: Darrell Phillip)
FBI Agent Larry Powell (Original cast member: Darrell Phillip)
Sam Teraoka (Original cast member: Michael Yama)

In the 2013 full revival, all of the roles were reprised by the original cast members except for Alice Goodwin (played by Kellie Dantzler), Felix Goodwin (Aaron Jennings), Jane "Princess" Goodwin (Iman Milner), FBI Agent Frank Morgan (Mark L. Colbenson), and Sam Teraoka (Vladimir Velasco). The character June Bug was edited out of the story.

References

External links
 Includes an image of the Time article.

2009 plays
American plays